PH domain and leucine rich repeat protein phosphatase, also known as PHLPP, is an enzyme which in humans is encoded by the PHLPP gene.

See also 
 PHLPP

References

Further reading